Muher (Muxar) is an Ethiopian Semitic language belonging to the Gurage group. It is spoken in the mountains north of Cheha and Ezhana Wolene in Ethiopia. The language has two dialects, which are named after the first-person singular pronoun "I" they use: Ana uses əni/anä, Adi uses adi/ädi (similar to the related language Soddo).

References 
Cohen, Marcel (1936). Etudes d’éthiopien méridional. Paris: Geuthner.
Hetzron, Robert (1977). The Gunnan-Gurage languages. Napoli : Istituto Orientale di Napoli.
Leslau, Wolf (1979). Etymological Dictionary of Gurage (Ethiopic). 3 vols. Wiesbaden: Otto Harrassowitz.
Leslau, Wolf (1981). Ethiopians Speak: Studies in Cultural Background, Part IV : Muher. Wiesbaden: Franz Steiner.
Meyer, Ronny (2005). "The morpheme yä- in Muher", in: Lissan - Journal of African Languages and Linguistics 19/1, pp. 40–63.
Polotsky, Hans Jakob (1939). "L labialisé en gouragué mouher", in: GLECS 3, pp. 66–68 [=Collected Papers by H. J. Polotsky (Jerusalem: Magnes press 1971), pp. 516–518].
Rose, Sharon (1996). "Allomorphy  and Morphological Categories in Muher", in: G. Hudson (ed.), Essays in Gurage Language and Culture (Wiesbaden: Harrassowitz Verlag), pp. 205–227.
Rose, Sharon (2000). "Velar Lenition in Muher Gurage", in: Lingua Posnaniensis 42, pp. 107–116.

Footnotes 

Languages of Ethiopia
Semitic languages